Mayday 3DNA (C: 五月天追夢3DNA, P: Wǔyuè Tiān Zhuī Mèng 3DNA) is a 2011 Taiwanese film directed by Wen Yen Kung (孔玟燕) with additional work from Charlie Chu (曲全立).

Within the pan-Chinese community it is the first 3D concert feature film. The film is about three fictional stories revolving around characters who wish to attend a concert in Shanghai from the band Mayday. Filming took two years and there was a production budget of $200 New Taiwan dollars. Post-production work took 17 months.

One story is set in Guangzhou, one story is set in Taipei, and one story is set in Shanghai.

Cast
 Zhang Yujian
 Rene Liu
 Richie Jen

References

External links
 

Films set in Guangzhou
Films set in Shanghai
2011 films
Taiwanese documentary films